The 2020 Copa Verde was the 7th edition of the football competition held in Brazil. Featuring 24 clubs, Acre, Amazonas, Distrito Federal, Espírito Santo, Mato Grosso do Sul and Pará have two vacancies; Amapá, Goiás, Mato Grosso, Rondônia, Roraima and Tocantins with one each. The others six berths was set according to CBF ranking. Due to the COVID-19 pandemic the tournament was rescheduled, starting only on 20 January 2021 and ending on 24 February 2021.

In the finals, Brasiliense defeated Remo 5–4 on penalties after tied 3–3 on aggregate to win their first title and a place in the third round of the 2021 Copa do Brasil.

Qualified teams

Schedule
The schedule of the competition is as follows.

First round

Draw

In the first round, each tie was played on a single-legged basis. The higher-ranked team hosted the match.  If the score was level, the match would go straight to the penalty shoot-out to determine the winner.

|}

Round of 16

In the round of 16, each tie was played on a single-legged basis. The higher-ranked team hosted the match.  If the score was level, the match would go straight to the penalty shoot-out to determine the winner.

|}

Bracket
From the quarter-finals, each tie was played on a home-and-away two-legged basis. If the aggregate score was level, the second-leg match would go straight to the penalty shoot-out to determine the winners.

Finals

Tied 3–3 on aggregate, Brasiliense won on penalties.

References

Copa Verde
Copa Verde
Copa Verde